Alexandra "Alex" Cottier (born 6 December 1973) is an English former international footballer. As well as the England women's national football team, Cottier played FA Women's Premier League football for clubs including Croydon and Arsenal.

Club career
Croydon player–manager Deborah Bampton signed Cottier and Donna Smith from Brighton in 1994. A versatile left–sided player, Cottier performed as a striker, winger and defender in Croydon's League and Cup double winning team in 1996.

In 2001–02 Cottier was on the books of Arsenal Ladies. She rejoined Southampton during the season.

In November 2003 Cottier quit relegated Southampton to sign for Bristol Rovers. Rovers manager Tony Ricketts said of Cottier: "Her experience of top flight football will be invaluable to us, as will the fact that she can play either in centre midfield or at centre half – those are two areas where we've been vulnerable since the start of the season."

Cottier signed for Andover New Street Ladies in summer 2008.

International career
Cottier represented England at senior level. She was called–up for the first time in March 1994, for a European Championship qualifier versus Belgium at the City Ground. Arsenal left–back Michelle Curley had withdrawn from the squad after she dislocated her knee in an FA Women's Cup tie. At the time Cottier's manager at Southern Division Brighton, Julie Hemsley, was also England coach Ted Copeland's assistant.

Personal life
Cottier served in the British Army and played football for their representative team.

References

1973 births
Living people
English women's footballers
Arsenal W.F.C. players
Bristol Academy W.F.C. players
Brighton & Hove Albion W.F.C. players
FA Women's National League players
Southampton Saints L.F.C. players
England women's international footballers
Women's association football utility players
Women's association football defenders
Women's association football midfielders
Women's association football forwards